Frank Williams (birth unknown – death unknown) was a Welsh rugby union and professional rugby league footballer and journalist. After retiring from rugby, he became a journalist, and worked as the sports editor for the Halifax Courier & Guardian for over 20 years.

Rugby career
Born in Birmingham, Williams moved to Swansea at a young age. He began playing rugby union at school, and represented Wales against England schoolboys.

He began playing for Swansea RFC as a centre at the age of 17, and played for the club until 1913, when he was persuaded to turn professional and join rugby league club Halifax.

Williams won a cap for Wales while at Halifax in 1914, and was also included in the squad for the 1914 Great Britain Lions tour of Australia and New Zealand. He won two caps against Australia on the tour, including in the famous "Rorke's Drift" Test.

His playing career ended in 1919–20, when he was forced to retire for medical reasons.

News career
After ending his playing career, Williams became a journalist for the Halifax Guardian until the paper merged with the Halifax Courier in 1921. After briefly returning to rugby in a coaching role, he joined the newly merged newspaper (now known as the Halifax Courier & Guardian). In 1938, he became sports editor for the newspaper, and remained in the role until his retirement in 1960.

References

External links
!Great Britain Statistics at englandrl.co.uk (statistics currently missing due to not having appeared for both Great Britain, and England)
Team – Past Players – W at swansearfc.co.uk

Footballers who switched code
Great Britain national rugby league team players
Halifax R.L.F.C. players
Place of birth missing
Place of death missing
Rugby league wingers
Swansea RFC players
Wales national rugby league team players
Welsh rugby league players
Welsh rugby union players
Year of birth missing
Year of death missing